Rockview Dam is a zoned earth-fill/rock-fill type dam located on the Palmiet River near Grabouw, Western Cape, South Africa. It was established in 1986 and serves mainly for pumping purposes (storage). The hazard potential of the dam has been ranked high (3).

See also
List of reservoirs and dams in South Africa
List of rivers of South Africa

References 

 List of South African Dams from the Department of Water Affairs

Elgin, Western Cape
Dams in South Africa
Dams completed in 1986